The Munich Intellectual Property Law Center (MIPLC) is a center for both research and education in intellectual property and competition law, founded in 2003 and based in Munich, Germany.  The MIPLC is a project of the George Washington University Law School and three German institutions: the Max Planck Institute for Innovation and Competition, the University of Augsburg, and the Technical University of Munich (TUM). It offers the English-language LL.M. program "Intellectual Property and Competition Law."

The MIPLC furthermore organizes scientific conferences.

See also 
Intellectual property organization

References

External links 
 Munich Intellectual Property Law Center (MIPLC)
 MIPLC at the Max Planck Institute for Intellectual Property and Competition Law
 MIPLC at the George Washington University Law School
 MIPLC at the University of Augsburg - German version (with more information)
 Master of Laws in Intellectual Property and Competition, offered by the MIPLC at the Technische Universität München

2003 establishments in Germany
Intellectual property organizations
Research institutes in Germany
Legal research institutes